The Reindeer People is a prehistoric fiction series by American author Megan Lindholm, published in 1988 by Ace Books.

Synopsis
The story centers on a female healer called Tillu who is kidnapped by reindeer herders and bears a son, Kerlew, who has disabilities. It follows their move to a different tribe in pursuit of freedom, Kerlew's apprenticeship to a shaman and the growth of Tillu's relationship with a herdsman.

Reception and analysis
Reviewing the French edition in 2004, Le Monde described it as "a remarkable novel, fascinating, harsh" with a strong female protagonist, and lamented the delay in its release in France. Scholar Nicholas Ruddick praised Lindholm's portrayal of "the flowering of Tillu’s selfhood" in a society where she does not fit in. In 1989 Vector  found the first novel well-characterized, and Interzone praised the second book's depiction of prehistoric tribes as realistic. A 1996 reference work was more critical, writing that Tillu was portrayed in "too modern" a fashion to fit within a historical setting. In 1990 Vector stated that the depiction of magic in Wolf's Brother was "refreshingly subtle" but was overall critical of the book, finding the characters "sketchily drawn", the story unengaging and the ending anticlimactic.

According to Ruddick, the Reindeer People is set in Bronze Age Lapland and features a Paleo-Lappish society. Describing the series as a prehistoric romance, he writes that it has thematic similarities to Jean M. Auel's Earth's Children series, in particular her historical romance The Plains of Passage. A theme explored in the story is the liberty of women in the prehistoric tribe.

Editions

References

External links
 

Novels by Robin Hobb
1988 American novels
1988 fantasy novels
American fantasy novel series
Novels set in prehistory
Book series introduced in 1988
Ace Books books